"Dancy's Dream" is a song recorded by American country music group Restless Heart. It was released in April 1990 as the second single from the album Fast Movin' Train.  The song reached number 5 on the Billboard Hot Country Singles & Tracks chart. It was written by Greg Jennings, Monty Powell and Tim DuBois.

Content
It is a mid-tempo song about a deacon who is haunted by an affair he held in his past in New Orleans, Louisiana, before marrying.

Music video
The music video was directed by John Lloyd Miller and premiered in mid-1990.

Chart performance

Year-end charts

References

1990 singles
Restless Heart songs
Songs written by Tim DuBois
Songs written by Monty Powell
Song recordings produced by Scott Hendricks
RCA Records Nashville singles
Music videos directed by John Lloyd Miller
1990 songs
Songs about infidelity
Songs about New Orleans